Johannes Löhr (5 July 1942 – 29 February 2016) was a German international football player and manager.

The striker scored 166 top division goals for 1. FC Köln, more than any other Köln player. He made his debut for the team in August 1964. His 27 goals in the 1967–68 season led the league, making him the first Köln player to do so.

Löhr won 20 caps for West Germany, scoring five goals. He appeared in all six matches of the DFB team at the 1970 FIFA World Cup in Mexico, playing as a left side attacker. It was his header back across the goal in extra-time against England, from a Jürgen Grabowski cross, that enabled Gerd Muller's winner in the 3–2 quarter-final win. 

After his career as player, he managed 1. FC Köln between 1983 and 1986. In 1986, he began working for the DFB and was coach of the West German team that won Bronze at the 1988 Summer Olympics in Seoul.

He died on 29 February 2016.

Honours
1. FC Köln
 Bundesliga: 1977–78
 DFB-Pokal: 1967–68, 1976–77, 1977–78

West Germany
 FIFA World Cup: Third place 1970
 UEFA European Championship: 1972

References

External links
 
 
 

1942 births
2016 deaths
People from Rhein-Sieg-Kreis
Sportspeople from Cologne (region)
People from the Rhine Province
German footballers
Germany international footballers
Germany under-21 international footballers
1. FC Köln players
1970 FIFA World Cup players
UEFA Euro 1972 players
UEFA European Championship-winning players
Bundesliga players
German football managers
1. FC Köln managers
Association football forwards
Sportfreunde 05 Saarbrücken players
Germany national under-21 football team managers
Footballers from North Rhine-Westphalia
West German footballers